Macrocoma aladina is a species of leaf beetle of Saudi Arabia, described by  &  in 1996.

References

aladina
Beetles of Asia
Beetles described in 1996
Insects of the Arabian Peninsula